Micronema is a genus of sheatfishes native to the Southeast Asian region.

Species of the genus Phalacronotus were formerly placed in this genus.

Species
There are currently three recognized species in this genus:
 Micronema hexapterus (Bleeker, 1851)
 Micronema moorei (Smith, 1945)
 Micronema platypogon (Ng, 2004)

References

External links

EOL - Micronema
Micronema hexapterus (Bleeker, 1851)
Micronema moorei (Smith, 1945)
Micronema platypogon (Ng, 2004)

Siluridae
Fish of Southeast Asia
Freshwater fish genera
Taxa named by Pieter Bleeker
Catfish genera